VFN in horticulture stands for Verticillium wilt, Fusarium, and Nematode disease resistance in tomatoes. Most  hybrid tomato varieties are labeled with some combination of one or more of these three letters, since disease resistance is a large part of the reason to hybridize tomatoes.

References

External links 
 Tomato diseases in Florida

Tomato diseases